This is a list of current and former female monarchs  regardless of title, including queens regnant, empresses regnant, pharaohs and monarchs by other titles (grand duchess, princess etc.). Where a monarch had no powers but only the title, "(titular)" is added instead. Queens consort (i.e. wives to male monarchs) are not included, see List of current consorts of sovereigns. Queens regent or female regents are included, see List of regents.

The following is an incomplete list of women monarchs who are well known from popular writings, although many ancient and poorly documented ruling monarchs (such as those from Africa and Oceania) are omitted. Section 1 lists Queens regnant: monarchs who ruled in their own right. Section 2 lists Queens regent: Queens who have ruled on behalf of a monarch who was a minor, absent or incapacitated. Section 3 lists Legendary queens. Section 4 lists Titular queens: Queens who ruled in their own right, but had no constitutional standing or regal powers while in power. Section 5 lists various female leaders who were referred to as "Chieftainess."

Queens regnant

Africa

North Africa

Algeria 
Hoggar
 Tin Hinan of Ahaggar (ruled c. 4th-century)
Jarawa
 Kahina (ruled c. 690–703)

Egypt 
Indigenous dynasties

 Sobekneferu (r. 1806-1802 BC) of the Twelfth Dynasty – Sobekneferu was the first confirmed female ruler of Egypt, although Nitocris may have ruled in the Sixth Dynasty, and there are five other women who are believed to have ruled as early as the First Dynasty
 Hatshepsut (c. 1479-1458 BC) of the Eighteenth Dynasty
 Neferneferuaten of the Eighteenth Dynasty (possibly Nefertiti or Meritaten or Neferneferuaten Tasherit)
 Twosret (d. 1189 BC) of the Nineteenth Dynasty

Ptolemaic dynasties

Ptolemy II instituted a new practice of brother-sister marriage when he married his full sister, Arsinoe II. They became, in effect, co-rulers, and both took the epithet Philadelphus ("Brother-Loving" and "Sister-Loving"). Because of this custom many of the kings ruled jointly with their spouses, who were also of the royal house. The only Ptolemaic Queens who ruled alone were Cleopatra II, Berenice III and Berenice IV. Cleopatra VI did co-rule, but it was with another female, Berenice IV. Cleopatra VII officially co-ruled with Ptolemy XIII Theos Philopator, Ptolemy XIV, and Ptolemy XV, but effectively, she ruled Egypt alone.

 Arsinoe II (277-270 BC)
 Berenice II (246-222 BC)
 Arsinoe III (220-204 BC)
 Cleopatra I (193-176 BC)
 Cleopatra II (175-164, 163–127, 124-116 BC)
 Cleopatra III (142-131, 127-101 BC)
 Cleopatra IV (116-115 BC)
 Berenice III (101-88, 81-80 BC)
 Cleopatra V (79-69 BC)
 Cleopatra VI (58-57 BC)
 Berenice IV (58-55 BC)
 Cleopatra VII (51-30 BC)
 Arsinoe IV (48-47 BC)

Bahri Mamluk dynasty
 Shajar al-Durr (ruled 1250)

Libya 
Cyrene
 Berenice II - Berenice, queen of Cyrene, married Ptolemy III, pharaoh of the Ptolemaic dynasty. This brought Cyrene back into the Ptolemaic realm and she became co-regent queen of the Ptolemaic Dynasty.
 Cleopatra Selene II (ruled 34–30 BC) – also known as Cleopatra VIII. In 75 BC, Cyrene became part of a Roman province, but it was restored to the Ptolemies by Mark Antony in 37 BC. In 34 BC Cleopatra VII and Antony's daughter, Cleopatra Selene II, was made Queen of Cyrene, but the city returned to Rome following Augustus' conquest of Egypt in 30 BC

Sudan 

Kandake was a title for queens, queen mothers, and queens consort in Nubia, but ruling Kandakes may have included:
 Shanakdakhete (ruled 177–155 BCE)
 Amanirenas (ruled 40–10 BCE)
 Amanishakheto (ruled c. 10 BCE–1 CE)
 Nawidemak
 Amanitore (ruled 1–20 CE) - she ruled with her husband or son Natakamani
 Amanikhatashan (ruled 62–85)
 Patrapeamani (:de:Patrapeamani) 
 Amanipilade

West Africa

Benin 
Hogbonu
 Hude (ruled 1746–1752)

Gambia 
 Elizabeth II (reigned 1965–1970)

Ghana 
 Elizabeth II (reigned 1957–1960)

Akan state of Denkyira
 Amoako Atta Yiadom (ruled 1770–1793), Denkyirahene

Akan state of Dwaben
 Ama Serwah (ruled 1838–1846), Dwabenhene
 Unknown Dwabenhene (ruled 1846-18??)
 Nana Juaben Serwah II (ruled 1959–19??), Dwabenhene

Guinea-Bissau 
Orango
 Okinka Aurelia Correia (ruled r. 1830–1874/1879)
 Okinka Pampa Kanyimpa (ruled c. 1910–1930)

Roxa
 Okinka Juliana (ruled early 1900s)
 Okinka Idiana Ibop (ruled until 1920s)

Côte d'Ivoire 
Baoule
 Pokou (ruled c. 1750–c. 1760) – Queen and founder of the Baoule tribe
 Akwa Boni (ruled c. 1760–c. 1790) Pokou's niece who succeeded her to the throne

Mali 
Mali Empire
 Kassi (ruled ?–1352/1353), co-ruler of Mansa Sulayman

Nigeria 
 Elizabeth II (1960–1963)

Bornu Empire
 Aissa Koli

Daura

 Kufuru
 Ginu
 Yakumo
 Yakunya
 Wanzamu
 Yanbamu
 Gizir-gizir
 Inna-Gari
 Daurama
 Ga-Wata
 Shata
 Fatatuma
 Sai-Da-Mata
 Ja-Mata
 Ha-Mata
 Zama
 Sha-Wata
 Daurama II

Igodomigodo
 Emose (584–600)
 Orrorro (600–618)

Ondo Kingdom
 Pupupu, founder and ruler of the Ondo Kingdom c. 1510.

Zazzau
 Amina – There is controversy among scholars as to the date of her reign, one school placing her in the mid-15th century, and a second placing her reign in the mid to late 16th century

Yoruba people
 Ooni Luwoo

Oyo Empire
 Orompoto

Senegal 

Lingeer's leadership activities were carried out at the highest tier, as a co-monarch.
 Lingeer Fatim Beye (ruled c. 1335)
 Lingeer Ndoye Demba (ruled c. 1367) – she was the founder of the Serer Joos Maternal Dynasty
 Lingeer Ngoné Dièye
 Njembot Mbodj
 Ndaté Yalla Mbodj
 Lingeer Selbeh Ndoffene Joof

Sierra Leone 
 Elizabeth II (1961–1971)

Koya
 Fatima Brima Kama, Alikali (ruled 1826–1840), Bai

Mende people
 Madam Yoko

Central Africa

Angola 
Jaga
 Mussasa (17th century)
 Tembandumba

Matamba

 Mwongo Matamba (ruled ?–1631) – she was captured and deposed by Ana Nzinga in 1631
 Ana I de Sousa Nzinga Mbande (ruled 1631–1663)
 Barbara (ruled 1663–1666)
 Verónica I Guterres Kandala Kingwanga (ruled 1681–1721)
 Ana II (ruled 1742–1756)
 Verónica II (ruled 1756–1758)
 Ana III (ruled 1758–1767)

Mbunda Kingdom
 Vamwene Naama
 Vamwene Yamvu
 Vamwene Mbaao ya Chinguli (ruled 1500s–early 1600s)
 Vamwene Kaamba ka Mbaao
 Vamwene Mukenge wa Lweembe, Livindamo

Ndongo
 Ana de Sousa Nzinga Mbande (ruled 1624–1626 and 1657–1663)
 Mukambu Mbandi (ruled 1663–1671)

Kingdom of Jinga
 Kamana

Kingdom of kongo

There were two female monarchs during Kongo Civil War.
 Ana Afonso de Leão, queen of Kinlaza
 Suzana de Nóbrega (:pt:Suzana de Nóbrega), queen of Kimpanzu

Cameroon 
 Soukda, founder of Mandara Kingdom (ruled c. 1500)
 Ngoungoure, queen of Bamum (ruled 1865) – her rule lasted 30 minutes

East Africa

Comoros 
Ndzuwani (Anjouan)
 Alimah I (ruled during the 16th century – unknown start date, reigned ended in c. 1590)
 Alimah II (ruled c. 1632–c. 1676)
 Alimah III (ruled c. 1676–c. 1711)
 Alimah IV (ruled 1788–1792) – she was the de facto ruler of Anjouan with sultan Abdallah I during his reigns in 1782–1788 and 1792–1796

Bamboa
 Nyau wa Faume

Itsandra
 Fey Beja waWabeja, Mfalme

Bajini
 Ja Mhaba, Mfalme
 Hadija bint Ahmed, Mfalme

Mwali
 Raketaka Jombe Sudy (ruled 1842–1865 and 1874–1878) – she also ruled as regent twice, 1865–1868 and 1871–1874. After 1851 she took the name of Jumbe Fatima bint Abderremane
 Salima Machamba bint Saidi Hamadi Makadara (ruled 1888–1909)

Ethiopia 
 Zewditu (ruled 1916–1930)

Sultanate of Harar
 Bati del Wambara

Kenya 
 Elizabeth II (1963–1964)

Names taken from Female Rule in the Indian Ocean World (1300–1900).

 Mwana Masuru
 Maryamu
 Mwana Mkisi
 Mwana Inali
 Mwana Darini binti Bwana Mkuu bin Abubakar
 Asha binti Muhammad
 Mwanai Mimi
 Mwana Khadija binti Omari

Madagascar 
 Rangita (ruled 1520–1530)
 Rafohy (ruled 1530–1540)
 Ranavalona I (ruled 1828–1861)
 Rasoherina (ruled 1863–1868)
 Ranavalona II (ruled 1868–1883)
 Ranavalona III (ruled 1883–1897)

The female monarchs of Madagascar traditional states were:

Ambohidratrimo
 Ramananandrianjaka Rambolamasoandro
 Rabehety

Boina Kingdom
 Andrianaginarivo (ruled 1777–1778)
 Tombola (ruled 1778)
 Ravahiny (ruled 1778–1808)
 Oantitsy (ruled 1832–1836)
 Tsiomeko (ruled 1836–1840)

Menabe
 Bibiasa

Bemihisatra
 Safy Mozongo (ruled 1869–1881) – she was the mother of Binao
 Binao

Bemazava
 Irana Andriamamelonarivo
 Tsiresy I Andriamanomponarivo
 Tsiresy II Nenimoana

Antankarana
 Ambary of Antankarana
 Soanaomby

Imarovatana
 Ramanandrianjaka II Ravorombato

Betsimisaraka
 Bety of Betsimisaraka

Mauritius 
 Elizabeth II (1968–1992)

Somaliland 
Sultanate of Ifat
 Māti Layla Abūd (14th century)

South Sudan 
Shilluk Kingdom
 Abudok (:fr:Abudok), the eighth ruler (and only queen) of the Shilluk

Tanzania 
 Elizabeth II (1961–1962)
 Therese Ntare VI of Heru

Names taken from Female Rule in the Indian Ocean World (1300–1900).

 Mwana Aziz
 Mwana Miveni
 Mwana Aisha
 Mwana Fatuma binti Darhash
 Mwana Hadiya
 Mwana Mize binti Muaba
 Mwana Mwema, queen of Unguja (ruled ?–1653)
 Fatuma binti Yussuf, queen of Unguja (ruled (?–1698 and 1709–1715)
 Mwana wa Mwana
 Mwanzuani
 Mwana Khazija binti Ngwali
 Fatuma binti Ali
 Sabini binti Ngumi

Uganda 
 Elizabeth II (1962–1963)

Bunyoro
 Masamba of Bunyoro (early 17th century) (5 Years)

Southern Africa

Malawi 
 Elizabeth II (1964–1966)

Namibia 
Gciriku
 Nandundu (ruled 1830–1832)

Kwangali
 Kanuni (hompa)

 Oukwanyama kingdom
 Martha Mwadinomho Nelumbu

South Africa 
 Elizabeth II (1952–1961)

Lobedu people

The Modjadji or Rain Queen is the hereditary queen of Lobedu, the people of the Limpopo Province of South Africa. The succession to the position of Rain Queen is matrilineal, meaning that the Queen's eldest daughter is the heir, and that males are not entitled to inherit the throne at all. The Rain Queen is believed to have special powers, including the ability to control the clouds and rainfall.

 Majaji (ruled c. 350 AD)
 Maselekwane Modjadji (1800–1854)
 Masalanabo Modjadji (1854–1894)
 Khetoane Modjadji (1895–1959)
 Makoma Modjadji (1959–1980)
 Mokope Modjadji (1981–2001)
 Makobo Modjadji (2003–2005)

Zambia 
 Mamochisane, queen of Makololo tribe (c. 1851)

Zimbabwe 
 Queen of Rhodesia (1965–1970)

The Americas

North America

Canada 
 Victoria (ruled 1837–1901)
 Elizabeth II (reigned 1952–2022)

Mexico 
Cobá
 Che'enal (ruled c.565–c.574)
 Lady Yopaat (:sv:Lady Yopaat) (ruled c.600–c.640)
 Lady K’awiil Ajaw (ruled 640–682)

Ecatepec
 Tlapalizquixochtzin (ruled late 15th-early 16th century)

Palenque

 Ix Yohl Ik'nal (ruled 583–604)
 Sak K'uk', also known as Muwaan Mat (ruled 612–615)

Tepetlaoztoc
 Azcasuch (ruled late 15th-early 16th century)

Tzacoalco
 Malinxalchitl

Central America and the Caribbean

Antigua and Barbuda 
 Elizabeth II (reigned 1981–2022)

Bahamas 
 Elizabeth II (reigned 1973–2022)

Barbados 
 Elizabeth II (reigned 1966–2021)

Belize 
 Elizabeth II (reigned 1981–2022)

Grenada 
 Elizabeth II (reigned 1974–2022)

Guatemala 
El Perú
 Lady K'abel

Naranjo
 Wac Chanil Ahau, also known as Lady Six Sky

Tikal
 Unen Bahlam (ruled c. 317)
 Lady of Tikal (ruled 511–527?)

Jamaica 
 Elizabeth II (reigned 1962–2022)

Saint Kitts and Nevis 

 Elizabeth II (reigned 1983–2022)

Saint Lucia 
 Elizabeth II (reigned 1979–2022)

Saint Vincent and the Grenadines 
 Elizabeth II (reigned 1979–2022)

South America

Brazil 
 Maria I (ruled 1815–1816)

Ecuador 

Cochasquí
Quilago

Quito
Paccha Duchicela

Guyana 
 Elizabeth II  (reigned 1966–1970)

Suriname 
 Juliana (reigned 1954–1975)

Trinidad and Tobago 
 Elizabeth II (reigned 1962–1976)

Asia

East Asia

China 

 Wu Zetian – Empress regnant of China, ruling from 690 to 705. She was the only orthodox reigning empress in the history of China.

Although Wu Zetian is the only undisputed empress regnant recognized in orthodox Chinese historiography, there are two other documented cases of a woman holding the title of "Empress regnant" in Chinese history:

 Daughter of Emperor Xiaoming of Northern Wei (ruled 1–2 April 528) – during Northern Wei Dynasty, Empress Dowager Hu, after her son Emperor Xiaoming of Northern Wei's death, falsely declared Emperor Xiaoming's daughter to be a son and declared the daughter to be the new ruler, but almost immediately revealed that the child was in fact female, and thereafter declared Yuan Zhao, the young son of Emperor Xiaoming's cousin Yuan Baohui (元寶暉) emperor. Emperor Xiaoming's daughter is also therefore not usually considered a true monarch.

Sumpa

In Tibet, there was "Kingdom of Women (:zh:東女國)" related to Sumpa. Several queens regnant of there were recorded in Chinese history books.
 Supi Mojie
 Dajiawa
 Qibangsun
 Tangpangshi
 Lianbi
 Eyaner
 Zhaoyefu

Japan 

 Queen Himiko, of Yamatai (ruled 189–248)
 Queen Toyo, of Yamatai (ruled 3rd century)
 Empress Suiko (554–628), (ruled 593–628) – first ruling empress
 Empress Kōgyoku, also known as Empress Saimei (594–661), (ruled 642–645 and 655–661) – formerly Princess Takara (Empress Consort of Jomei)
 Empress Jitō (645–702), (ruled 690–697)
 Empress Genmei (661–721), (ruled 707–715)
 Empress Genshō (680–748), (ruled 715–724) – formerly Princess Hidaka
 Empress Kōken, also known as Empress Shōtoku (718–770), (ruled 749–758 and 764–770)
 Empress Meishō (1624–1696), (ruled 1629–1643)
 Empress Go-Sakuramachi (1740–1813), (ruled 1762–1771) – last empress regnant of Japan

Korea 
Silla
 Seondeok (ruled 632–647)
 Jindeok (ruled 647–652)
 Jinseong (ruled 887–897)

South Asia

Bangladesh 
Chandra dynasty
 Kuverami (ruled 334–341)
 Umavira (ruled 341–361)
 Nitichandra (ruled 520–575)
 Pritichandra (ruled 578–90)

India 
Alupa dynasty
 Ballamahadevi (ruled 1275–1292) – she ruled with her son Nagadevarasa

Arakkal dynasty

 Ali Raja Bibi Harrabichi Kadavube (ruled 1728–1732)
 Ali Raja Bibi Junumabe I (ruled 1732–1745)
 Ali Raja Bibi Junumabe II (ruled 1777–1819)

Bhauma-Kara dynasty
 Tribhuvana Mahadevi I (ruled 845–850)
 Tribhuvana Mahadevi II (ruled 890–896)
 Tribhuvana Mahadevi III (ruled 896–905)
 Gauri Mahadevi (ruled c. 910–916)
 Dandi Mahadevi (ruled c. 916–936)
 Vakula Mahadevi (ruled c. 936–940)
 Dharma Mahadevi (ruled c. 940–950)

Bhopal State
 Qudsia Begum (ruled 1819–1837) – in 1819, 18-year-old Qudsia Begum (also known as Gohar Begum) took over the reins after the assassination of her husband, Nawab Muiz Muhammad Khan Bahadur. She was the first female ruler of Bhopal. She declared that her 2-year-old daughter Sikander would follow her as the ruler; none of the male family members dared to challenge her decision. She ruled till 1837, when she died having adequately prepared her daughter for ruling the state.
 Begum Sultan Shah Jehan (ruled 1844–1860 and 1868–1901) – Shahjahan was the only surviving child of Sikandar Begum, sometime Nawab of Bhopal by correct title, and her husband Jahangir Mohammed Khan. She was recognised as ruler of Bhopal in 1844 at the age of six; her mother wielded power as regent during her minority. However, in 1860, her mother Sikandar Begum was recognised by the British as ruler of Bhopal in her own right, and Shahjahan was set aside.
 Begum Nawab Sikandar (ruled 1860–1868)
 Begum Kaikhusrau Jahan (ruled 1901–1926)

British Raj
 Victoria, Empress of India (ruled 1876–1901)

Gerusoppa
 Rani Chennabhairadevi (ruled 1552–1606)

Holkar dynasty
 Ahilyabai Holkar (ruled 1767–1795), also known as the Philosopher Queen

Kakatiya dynasty
 Rani Rudrama Devi (ruled 1262–1295)

Kashmir
 Sugandha (ruled 904–906)
 Didda (ruled 980–1003), she ruled first as a Regent for her son Abhimanyu and thereafter as sole ruler in her own right
 Kota Rani (ruled 1338–1339)

Keladi Nayaka dynasty
 Keladi Chennamma (ruled 1672–1697)
 Virammaji (ruled 1757–1763)

Mamluk dynasty
 Razia Sultana (ruled 1236–1240)

Oiniwar dynasty
 Viswavasa Devi (ruled 1431–1443)

Sambalpur State
 Rani Mohan Kumari (ruled 1827–1833)

Sivaganga estate
 Velu Nachiyar
 Vellacci

Thanjavur Maratha kingdom
 Sujana Bai (ruled 1737–1738)

Travancore Kingdom
 Gowri Lakshmi Bayi of Travancore (ruled 1810–1813) – she also ruled 1813–1815 as regent

Ullal
 Abbakka Chowta (ruled 1525–1570)

Maldives 
 Damahaar (ruled before 990) – Damahaar, a Ranin (Queen) of the Aadeetta (Sun) Dynasty, is mentioned by al-Idrisi as having reigned over the Maldives at some time before the semi-legendary King Koimala; there are several other mentions by foreign travelers, mainly Arabs, of queens ruling over the Maldives at various times; these are not always named and their reigns cannot be precisely dated
 Khadijah (ruled 1347–1363, 1364–1374 and 1376–1380)
 Raadhafathi (ruled 1380)
 Dhaain (ruled 1385–1388)
 Kuda Kala Kamanafa’anu (ruled 1607–1609)
 Amina I (ruled 1753–1754)
 Amina II (ruled 1757–1759)

Pakistan 
 Elizabeth II (reigned 1952–1956)

Gilgit
 Dadi Jawari, also known as Malika Jawahir Khatun
 Malika Sahibnuma, also known as Sahebnuma (ruled 1825–1828)

Sindh
 Zainab Tari (ruled 1092–1102)

Sri Lanka 

 Anula of Anuradhapura (ruled 47–42 BC)
 Sivali of Anuradhapura (ruled 35)
 Lilavati of Polonnaruwa (ruled 1197–1200, 1209–1210 and 1211–1212)
 Kalyanavati of Polonnaruwa (ruled 1202–1208)
 Kusumasana Devi (ruled 1581)
 Sugala Devi - she led Queen Sugala rebellion in 1157
 Elizabeth II (reigned 1952–1972)

Southeast Asia

Cambodia 

Funan Kingdom
 Queen Soma (ruled 1st century)
 Kulaprabhavati (ruled 514–517) – there was a succession war between her and her stepson Rudravarman for three years

Chenla
 Kambuja-raja-lakshmi (:km:កម្វុជរាជលក្ឝ្មី (ចេនឡា)) (ruled 575–580)
 Jayadevi (ruled 681–713) – during her rule, she was faulted in leadership which led The Chenla kingdom to break into two individual states, but then it record the period to be female-dominated dynasty with the wide range of female successors, totally driving the entire kingdom

Sambhupura Chenla
 Indrani (ruled 8th century) – she ruled with her husband Pushkaraksha
 Nṛpatendradevī (ruled 8th century)
 Jayendrabhā (ruled 8th century)
 Jyeṣṭhāryā (ruled c. 803)

Post-Angkor period
 Queen Tey (ruled 1687)
 Ang Mey (ruled 1834–1840) – also known as Ngọc Vân Quận chúa (Lady Ngọc Vân – Vietnamese) or Ksat Trey, she was proclaimed on the death of her father by the Vietnamese faction at court with the title of Mỹ Lâm Quận chúa (Lady Mỹ Lâm – Vietnamese). She was famous as a Vietnamese puppet queen

Indonesia 
Aceh
 Seri Ratu Ta'jul Alam Shah (ruled 1641–1675) – the Sultana of Atjeh (Aceh) Darussalam, formerly known as Puteri Seri Alam the Daughter of The Great Sultan Iskandar Muda, and wife of Sultan Iskandar Thani
 Seri Ratu Naqiatuddin Nurul Alam (ruled 1675–1678)
 Seri Ratu Inayat Shah (ruled 1678–1688)
 Seri Ratu Kamalat Syah (ruled 1688–1699) – she was deposed and replaced by her husband under pressure from the Mufti of Mecca

Bali
 Śri Wijaya Mahadewi (ruled c. 983)
 Mahendradatta (ruled before 989–1007)
 Śri Ajñadewi (ruled c. 1016)
 Śri Maharaja Sakalendukirana Laksmidhara Wijayottunggadewi (ruled c. 1088–1101)
 Arjayadengjayaketana (ruled c. 1200)
 Unnamed Queen (ruled ?–1284) – In AD 1284, the Javanese king Kertanegara attacked Bali Kingdom and captured the queen of Bali. Her name is unknown.
 Dewa Agung Istri Kanya (ruled 1814–1850)

Tanette
 Siti Aisyah We Tenriolle (ruled 1855–1910)

Kalingga
 Maharani Shima (ruled 674–695)

Majapahit

 Tribhuwana Wijayatunggadewi (ruled 1328–1350)
 Suhita (ruled 1429–1447)

Mataram
 Śri Isyana Tunggawijaya (ruled 947–985)

Mengwi
 Gusti Ayu Istri Biang Agung (ruled 1836–1857)

Sonbai Kecil
 Bi Sonbai (ruled 1672–1717), in western Timor

Kalinyamat Sultanate
 Ratu Kalinyamat

Sultanate of Gowa
 Tumanurung Baine

Samudera Pasai Sultanate
 Ratu Nahrasyiyah (:id:Malikah Nahrasiyah)

Bone state
 We Banrigau, Mallajange ri Cina
 We Tenrituppu, MatinroE ri Bantaeng
 We Bataritoja, Sultanah Zainab Zulkiyahtuddin (ruled 1714–1715 and 1724–1749)
 We Imaniratu, Sultanah Rajituddin
 We Tenriawaru, Sultanah Ummulhuda
 We Fatimah Banri, Datu Citta

Sultanate of Buton
 Wa kaa kaa (ruled 1332–?)
 Bulawambona (ruled 14th century)

Laos 
Lan Xang
 Nang Keo Phimpha (ruled 1438) – after her nephew Lan Kham Deng died, she seized control of Lan Xang and the next four kings were under her control. She only reigned for a few months in 1438 at the age of 95; she was then deposed and killed.

Malaysia 
Kelantan
 Siti Wan Kembang (ruled 1610–1667)
 Puteri Saadong (ruled 1667–1671)

Myanmar 
Hanthawaddy
 Shin Sawbu (ruled 1454–1471)

Philippines 
 Namayan and Tondo
 Kalangitan (ruled 1450–1515)

Sulu
 Nur ul-Azam (ruled c. 1680–1685)

Thailand 
Hariphunchai
 Jamadevi (6th-7th century), first ruler of the Mon kingdom of Hariphunchai

Pattani
 Ratu Hijau, 'the Green Queen' (ruled 1584–1616)
 Ratu Biru, 'the Blue Queen' (ruled 1616–1624)
 Ratu Ungu, 'the Purple Queen' (ruled 1624–1635)
 Ratu Kuning, 'the Yellow Queen' (ruled 1635–1649/88), controversy surrounds the exact date of the end of her reign
 Ratu Emas Kelantan (ruled 1670–1698 or 1690–1704) – thought by A. Teeuw & Wyatt to be a king, but claimed by al-Fatani to be a queen, the widow of Raja Bakal and mother of the succeeding queen
 Ratu Emas Chayam (ruled 1698–1702 or 1704–1707 and 1716–1718)

Lanna
 Chiraprapha (ruled 1545–1546)
 Wisutthi Thewi (ruled 1564–1578)

Timor 
Alas
 Dona Maria Borromeu Duarte (ruled 1945–1952)

Ainaro
 Dona Maria Amado de Jesus Corte-Real (ruled 1943–1960)

Venilale
 Dona Catarina de Freitas (ruled 1808–1812)

Bobonaro
 Two queens (widows of Dom Lac-Theu and Dom Tai Mau)

Ermera
 Dona Vasso Bere (ruled 1849-after 1854)

Luca
 Dona Rosa Amaral (ruled 1881–1896)

Jenilu
 Raja Perempuan (ruled 1845)
 Mariana Rosa da Costa (ruled 1879–1893)

Lakekun
 Balok Lorok
 Hoar Teti

Lidak
 Petronella da Costa (ruled 1901–1913)

Sonba'i Kecil
 Usi Tetu Utang (ruled 1672–1717)

Amfoan
 Anna Elisabeth Aunoni (ruled 1881–1902)

Vietnam 
 Queen Trưng Trắc (ruled 40–43) – the Trưng sisters (Vietnamese: Hai Bà Trưng; literally: two ladies Trưng) were leaders who rebelled against Chinese rule for three years, and are regarded as national heroines of Vietnam. Her name is Trưng Trắc.
 Trưng Nhị (:vi:Trưng Nhị), co-ruler of Trưng Trắc
 Lady Triệu (ruled 248)
 Empress Lý Chiêu Hoàng (ruled 1224–1225)

Champa
 Isanavarman (ruled ?–653)

West Asia

Iran 
 Musa of Parthia (Parthian queen regnant of Iran, ruled 2 BC–4 AD) – she ruled with her son Phraates V
 Pourandukht (In Persian: Pourandokht, Sassanid queen regnant and Daughter of Khosrow Parviz, ruled 630 and 631–632)
 Azarmidokht (Sassanid queen regnant, sister of Pourandukht and daughter of Khosrow Parviz, ruled 630–631)

Elymais
 Anzaze (ruled about 82/81 to 75 BC, following dates on the coins), she appears on coins together with king Kamnaskires III; they perhaps ruled together as on the coins she is called βασιλίσσης (the Genitive case of queen, βασίλισσα – basílissa)
 Ulfan (ruled 2nd century) – she co-ruled with her husband Orodes III

Ahmadilis
 Sulafa Khatun

Qutlugh-Khanids
 Kutlugh Turkan
 Padishah Khatun
 Kurdujin Khatun

Salghurids
 Abish Khatun (ruled 1264–1284)

Il Khanate
 Sati Beg (ruled 1338–1339)

Khorshidi dynasty
 Dawlat Khatun

Iraq 
Kish
 Kubaba, the only queen on the Sumerian King List (ruled 25th century BC)

First Dynasty of Ur
 Puabi (ruled c. 26th century BC) – there is a theory that she ruled on her own right

Jalayirid Sultanate
 Tandu Khatun

Israel 
Judah
 Athaliah (ruled 843–835 BC)

Hasmonean dynasty
 Salome Alexandra (ruled 76–67 BC)

Herodian dynasty
 Salome I (ruled 4 BC-10 AD) – she ruled as Toparch of Jabneh, Ashdod and Phasaelis
 Livia (ruled 10–29) – she ruled as Toparch of Jabneh

Crusader Kingdom of Jerusalem
 Melisende (ruled 1131–1153) – she ruled with her husband Fulk of Anjou and her son Baldwin III as co-rulers
 Sibylla (ruled 1186–1190) – she ruled with her husband Guy de Lusignan as co-ruler
 Isabella I (ruled 1190/92–1205) – she ruled with her husbands Conrad of Montferrat, Henry of Champagne and Aimery of Cyprus as co-rulers
 Maria (ruled 1205–1212) – she ruled with her husband John of Brienne as co-ruler from 1210
 Isabella II (ruled 1212–1228), also known as Yolande of Jerusalem – she ruled with her husband Frederick II of Hohenstaufen as co-ruler from 1225

Jordan 
Gileadite
 Laodice of the Sameans (ruled c. 92 BC) – In the Codex Leidensis, the people of Laodice is Gileadites.

Nabatea
 Chuldu (ruled 9 BC–16 AD) – she ruled with her husband Aretas IV Philopatris
 Shaqilath – she ruled with her husband Aretas IV Philopatris
 Shaqilath II – she ruled with her husband Malichus II; after his death she was regent for her son Rabbel II Soter
 Gamilath – she ruled with Rabbel II Soter
 Hagaru – she ruled with Rabbel II Soter

Lebanon 
Tripoli
 Lucia of Tripoli (ruled 1287–1289)

Saudi Arabia 
Qedarite
 Zabibe (ruled c. 750–735 BC)
 Samsi (ruled c. 735–710 BC)
 Yatie (ruled c. 710–695 BC)
 Te'el-hunu (ruled c. 695–690 BC)
 Tabua (ruled c. 678–675 BC)

Syria 
Tanukhids
 Mavia (ruled 375–425) – "The Queen of the Arabs"

Seleucid Empire
 Cleopatra Thea (ruled 126–121 BC) – she ruled with her sons Seleucus V and Antiochus VIII
 Cleopatra Selene I (ruled 82–69 BC) – she ruled with her son Antiochus XIII

Palmyrene Empire
 Zenobia (ruled 272) – she ruled mostly as regent for her son but reigned briefly under the regnal name Septimia Zenobia Augusta in 272.

Turkey 

Antioch
 Constance (Princess) (ruled 1130–1163)

Armenian Kingdom of Cilicia
 Isabella (ruled 1219–1252) – she co-ruled with her husband Hethum I from 1226

Caria
 Artemisia I (ruled c. 480 BC)
 Artemisia II (ruled 353–351 BC)
 Ada (ruled 344–340 and 334–326 BC)

Dardania
 Mania (ruled after 399 BC) – queen of ancient Dardania according to Polyaenus and Xenophon

Heraclea Pontica
 Amastris (ruled c. 300-284 BC)

Pontus
 Pythodorida (ruled 8 BC–38 AD)

Olba Kingdom
 Queen Aba (ruled 1st century BC)

Prusias ad Mare
 Orodaltis (ruled c. after 30 BC)

Saltukid dynasty
 Melike Mama Hatun (ruled 1191–1200)

Trebizond
 Theodora Megale Komnene (ruled 1284–1285)
 Eirene Palaiologina (ruled 1340–1341)
 Anna Megale Komnene (ruled 1341–1342)

Yemen 
Sulayhid dynasty
 Asma bint Shihab (ruled 1047–1087) – she was the co-ruler of Yemen in co-regency with her cousin and spouse, Ali al-Sulayhi, and later her son, Ahmad al-Mukkaram, and daughter-in-law, Arwa al-Sulayhi. Though there were many female monarchs in the Muslim world, Asma bint Shihab and Arwa al-Sulayhi were the only female monarchs in the Arab world to have had the khutba proclaimed in their name in the mosques as sovereigns.
 Arwa al-Sulayhi (ruled 1067–1138) – she ruled Yemen firstly with her first two husbands and her mother-in-law and then as sole ruler. She was the greatest of the rulers of the Sulayhid Dynasty and was also the first woman to be accorded the prestigious title of hujja in Isma'ili branch of Shi'a Islam, signifying her as the closest living image of God's will in her lifetime.

Central Asia

Uzbekistan 
 Tomyris, queen of Massagetae (ruled c. 570-520 BC)

Europe

Andorra 
 Isabella (ruled 1398–1413)
 Catherine (ruled 1483–1512, 1513–1517)
 Jeanne d'Albret (ruled 1555–1572)

Armenia 
 Erato (ruled 8 BC–1 AD and 6–12 AD) – she ruled with Tigranes IV and Tigranes V

Austria 
 Maria Theresa (Archduchess) (ruled 1740–1780) – she was the only female ruler of the Habsburg dominions and the last of the House of Habsburg. She was the sovereign of Austria, Hungary, Croatia, Bohemia, Mantua, Milan, Lodomeria and Galicia, the Austrian Netherlands and Parma. In some of the Habsburg dominions (such as Hungary, Croatia, Bohemia and Lodomeria and Galicia), she held the title of queen. By marriage, she was also Duchess of Lorraine, Grand Duchess of Tuscany and Holy Roman Empress (all as consort).

Marcomanni 
 Fritigil (ruled mid 4th century)

Bosnia 
 Jelena Gruba (ruled 1395–1398)

Bulgaria

Odrysian kingdom 
 Antonia Tryphaena (ruled 18–38) – she ruled with her son Rhoemetalces II
 Pythodoris II (ruled 38–46) – she ruled with Rhoemetalces III

Croatia 
 Mary (ruled 1382–1385 and 1386–1395) – co-king of Sigismund starting from 1387
 Maria Theresa (Queen) (ruled 1740–1780)

Cyprus 
 Charlotte (ruled 1458–1464)
 Catherine Cornaro (ruled 1474–1489)
 Elizabeth II (reigned 1952–1960)

Czech lands 
 Maria Theresa (Queen) (ruled 1740–1780)

Denmark 
 Margaret I (ruled 1387–1412) – she was founder of the Kalmar Union, which united the Scandinavian countries for over a century. Margaret is known in Denmark as "Margrethe I" to distinguish her from the current queen. Denmark did not have a tradition of allowing women to rule, so when her son died, she was titled "All-powerful Lady and Mistress (Regent) of the Kingdom of Denmark". She only styled herself Queen of Denmark in 1375, usually referring to herself as "Margaret, by the grace of God, daughter of Valdemar King of Denmark" and "Denmark's rightful heir" when referring to her position in Denmark. Others simply referred to her as the "Lady Queen", without specifying what she was queen of, but not so Pope Boniface IX, who in his letters styled her "our beloved daughter in Christ, Margaret, most excellent queen of Denmark, Sweden and Norway"
 Margaret II (reign 1972–present)

Georgia 

 Dinar of Hereti (ruled 10th-century) – she ruled with her son Ishkhanik
 Tamar of Georgia (ruled 1184–1213)
 Rusudan of Georgia (ruled 1223–1245)
 Tamar of Kartli (ruled 1744–1746) – she ruled with her husband Teimuraz II

Greece

Aeacid dynasty 
 Deidamia II (ruled c. 233 BCE)

Byzantine Empire 
 Irene of Athens (ruled 797-802) – she normally referred to herself as basilissa (empress), although there are three instances of the title basileus (emperor) being used by her. From 792 she was a co-ruler.
 Theodora the Armenian (ruled 842-856, disputed) - after the death of her husband she became the co-ruler of her son but in fact she ruled the empire alone; among historians, some consider her a regent, and some consider her an empress regnant.
 Zoë Porphyrogenita (ruled 1028–1041 and 1042–1050) – she ruled with her consorts Romanos III and Michael IV between 1028 and 1041; she ruled with her sister Theodora and her third husband Constantine IX from 1042 to 1050
 Theodora Porphyrogenita (ruled 1042–1056) – she ruled from 1042 jointly with her sister Zoe and Zoe's third husband Constantine IX; she ruled from 1055 until her own death as sole monarch.
 Eudokia Makrembolitissa (ruled 1067-1071, disputed) - after the death of her husband she became a ruler; among historians, some consider her a regent, and some consider her an empress regnant

Epirus 
 Maria Angelina Doukaina Palaiologina (ruled 1384–1385)

Frankokratia 
Latin Empire was disestablished in 1261, but Latin states in Greece, also known as Frankokratia, continued to recognize Latin emperors in exile as their overlords until 1383.
 Catherine I, Latin Empress
 Catherine II, Latin Empress

Hungary 
 Mary (ruled 1382–1385 and 1386–1395) – she was crowned as King of Hungary to emphasize that she was a monarch in her own right; she co-ruled with her husband Sigismund of Luxembourg from 1387
 Maria Theresa (Queen, "King") (ruled 1740–1780)

Ireland

Kingdom of Ireland 
 Jane Grey (ruled 1553) (disputed)
 Mary I (ruled 1553–1558)
 Elizabeth I (ruled 1558–1603)
 Mary II (ruled 1689–1694) – she co-ruled with her husband William III
 Anne (ruled 1702–1714)

Italy

Naples 
 Joan I (ruled 1343–1382)
 Joan II (ruled 1414–1435)
 Joan III the Mad (ruled 1516–1555)

Ostrogoths 
 Amalasuintha (ruled 534–535) – she ruled first as regent for her son and thereafter as queen regnant in her own right

Parma 
 Maria Theresa (Duchess) (ruled 1740–1748)
 Marie Louise (Duchess) (ruled 1814–1847)

Sardinia 
 Elena of Gallura (ruled 1202 or 1203–1218)
 Benedetta of Cagliari (ruled 1214–1232 or 1233)
 Adelasia of Torres (ruled 1236–1259)
 Joanna of Gallura (ruled 1298–1308)
 Eleanor of Arborea (ruled 1383–1404)

Sicily 
 Constance I (ruled 1194–1198) – she co-ruled with her husband Henry VI, Holy Roman Emperor until 1197
 Constance II (ruled 1282–1285) – she co-ruled with her husband Peter III of Aragon
 Maria (ruled 1377–1401) – she co-ruled with her husband Martin I the Younger from 1392
 Joan the Mad (ruled 1516–1555)

Luxembourg 
 Marie-Adélaïde (Grand Duchess) (ruled 1912–1919)
 Charlotte (Grand Duchess) (ruled 1919–1964)

Malta 
 Elizabeth II (reigned 1964–1974)

Lithuania 
 Anna (ruled 1575–1587), Elected co-monarch with Stephen Báthory

Monaco 
 Claudine (Lady) (ruled 1457–1458)
 Louise Hippolyte (Princess) (ruled 1731)

Netherlands 
 Wilhelmina (reigned 1890–1948)
 Juliana (reigned 1948–1980)
 Beatrix (reigned 1980–2013)

Norway 
 Margaret (ruled 1388–1412)

Agder 
 Åsa (ruled 9th-century)

Poland 
 Jadwiga (ruled 1384–1399) – she was crowned as King of Poland to emphasize that she was a monarch in her own right; she co-ruled with her husband Władysław II Jagiełło from 1386
 Anna (ruled 1575–1586) – she was crowned as King of Poland and Grand Duke of Lithuania to emphasize that she was a monarch in her own right; she co-ruled with her husband Stephen Báthory

Portugal 

 Theresa (ruled 1116–1128, disputed)
 Beatrice (ruled 1383–1385, disputed)
 Maria I (ruled 1777–1816)
 Maria II (ruled 1826–1828 and 1834–1853)

Russia 

 Irina Godunova (ruled 1598, disputed) – she reigned for just nine days after her husband's death.
 Catherine I (ruled 1725–1727)
 Anna (ruled 1730–1740)
 Elizabeth (ruled 1741–1762)
 Catherine II ("the Great") (ruled 1762–1796)

Sabir people 
 Queen Boa, also known as Boareks (ruled 520s)

Kingdom of the Cimmerian Bosporus 
 Kamasarye Philoteknos (ruled 180–150 BC) – she co-ruled with her husband Paerisades III
 Dynamis (ruled in 47 BC, 44–17 BC and 16–14 BC) – she co-ruled with her first husband Asander in 47 BC and from 44 BC until 17 BC; then she co-ruled with her second husband Polemon I from 16 BC until her death
 Gepaepyris (ruled 37 or 38–39 AD)

Khanate of Qasim 
 Fatima Soltan (ruled 1679–1681)

Spain 

 Isabella II of Spain (ruled 1833–1868)

Aragon 

 Petronila of Aragon (ruled 1137–1164)
 Joanna of Castile and Aragon the Mad (ruled 1516–1555) – after her husband's death she was deemed mentally ill and was confined to a nunnery. Her father, Ferdinand II of Aragon, was regent in Castile until his death, when she inherited his kingdom as well and began her nominal co-reign with her son Charles I of Spain, but she had no actual power and her confinement lasted until her death.

Kingdoms of León and Castile 

 Urraca of León and Castile (ruled 1109–1126) – also styled as Empress of all the Spains (totius Hispaniae imperatrix). Her use of the imperial styling was limited, much more so than that of her predecessor and successor (it is possible that the imperial style had connotations too strongly masculine). Urraca did employ instead the title Queen of Spain on several occasions from the very beginning of her reign until the end
 Berenguela of Castile the Great (ruled 1217)
 Sancha of León (ruled de jure 1230) – she ruled jointly with her sister Dulce. After the death of Sancha's brother, Alfonso IX named his second son, Ferdinand, his heir, bestowing on him the title infante. In 1217, Ferdinand's mother, Berengaria, inherited the Kingdom of Castile, but ceded it to her son. With his heir out of the kingdom and ruling in another place, Alfonso attempted to make his eldest daughters his joint heirs. In the Treaty of Boronal concluded with Portugal in 1219, Alfonso expressly states that if he should die, Portugal should respect the agreement with his daughters. Alfonso also attempted to secure his eldest daughter's rights by marrying Sancha to John of Brienne, the former King of Jerusalem, but his wife Berengaria blocked this action in order to advance her son. After this fiasco, Alfonso declared Sancha and Dulce his heirs, but upon his death on 24 September 1230, the people of León, who had pledged for Ferdinand in 1206, refused to recognise his daughters, and they in turn ceded their rights to his kingdom to their half-brother
 Dulce of León (ruled de jure 1230) – she ruled jointly with her sister Sancha
 Isabella I of Castile the Catholic (ruled 1474–1504) – After a struggle to claim her right to the throne, she reorganised the governmental system, brought the crime rate to the lowest it had been in years, and unburdened the kingdom of the enormous debt her brother had left behind. Her marriage with Ferdinand II of Aragon brought stability to the kingdoms that became the basis for the political unification of Spain. Her reforms and those she made with her husband had an influence that extended well beyond the borders of their united kingdoms. Isabella and Ferdinand are known for completing the Reconquista, ordering conversion or exile of their Muslim and Jewish subjects in the Spanish Inquisition, and for supporting and financing Christopher Columbus's 1492 voyage that led to the opening of the New World.
 Joanna of Castile and Aragon the Mad (ruled 1504–1555) – successor of the previous.

Navarre 
 Toda Aznárez (ruled 950s–970s) – was the queen consort of Pamplona through her marriage to Sancho I, who reigned from 905 to 925, and was regent of Pamplona for her son García Sánchez I from 931 to 934. Later in life, she ruled a subkingdom created for her
 Joan I (ruled 1274–1305)
 Joan II (ruled 1328–1349)
 Blanche I (ruled 1425–1441)
 Blanche II (ruled de jure 1461–1464)
 Eleanor (ruled in 1479)
 Catherine (ruled 1483–1517)
 Joan III (ruled 1555–1572)

Sweden 

 Margaret (ruled 1389–1412)
 Christina (ruled 1632–1654) – she was crowned as King of Swedes, Goths and Vandals to emphasize that she was a monarch in her own right
 Ulrika Eleonora (ruled 1718–1720)

United Kingdom

Kingdoms of the Britons 
 Cartimandua (ruled c. 43–69), queen of the Brigantes, a Celtic people in what is now Northern England – she came to power around the time of the Roman conquest of Britain, and formed a large tribal agglomeration that became loyal to Rome; she is known exclusively from the work of a single Roman historian, Tacitus, though she appears to have been widely influential in early Roman Britain
 Boudica (ruled c. 60–61), queen of the Brythonic Celtic Iceni, people of Norfolk, in Eastern Britain – in 61 AD, led a major uprising of the tribes against the occupying forces of the Roman Empire

Anglo-Saxon kingdoms 
 Seaxburh of Wessex (ruled c. 672–674) – she reigned jointly with her husband Cenwalh and, according to tradition, ruled Wessex as Queen for a year following Cenwalh's death in c. 672
 Æthelflæd of Mercia (ruled 911–918) – eldest daughter of king Alfred the Great of Wessex, wife of Æthelred II, ealdorman of Mercia, and after his death, sole ruler of Mercia. While her husband was alive, she signed agreements, leading some to think that she was the real leader. The Anglo-Saxon Chronicle styles her Lady of the Mercians (Myrcna hlæfdige)
 Ælfwynn of Mercia (ruled 918) – daughter of Æthelflæd and Æthelred II, styled Lady of the Mercians. Deposed by her uncle, Edward the Elder (4 December 918), who annexed Mercia to Wessex, creating the Kingdom of England

Kingdom of England 
 Matilda (ruled 1141, disputed) – She was England's first de facto female ruler, holding the title of Lady of the English (she planned to assume the title of queen upon her coronation). She was declared heir presumptive by her father, Henry I, and acknowledged as such by the barons; however, upon the death of her father in 1135, Matilda's rival and cousin Stephen of Blois usurped the throne. The Anarchy followed, with Matilda's being a de facto ruler for a few months in 1141, but she was never crowned and failed to consolidate her rule (legally and politically)
 Jane (ruled 1553, disputed) – her cousin Edward VI of England nominated Jane as successor to the Crown in his will and excluded his half sisters, Mary and Elizabeth. However, this was disputed following Edward's death, since parliament had not ratified his action and Jane was ‘queen’ for only nine days (10–19 July) before Edward's half-sister, Mary, was proclaimed Queen. Jane is nicknamed The Nine Days' Queen
 Mary I (ruled 1553–1558)
 Elizabeth I (ruled 1558–1603)

Kingdom of Scotland 
 Margaret, Maid of Norway (ruled 1286–1290) She was daughter of Eric II of Norway and Margaret of Scotland and was named "domina and right heir" of the Kingdom of Scotland by her grandfather, Alexander III. Her death, at the age of seven, while en route to Scotland sparked off the disputed succession which led to the Wars of Scottish Independence. As Margaret was never crowned or otherwise inaugurated, and never set foot on what was then Scottish soil during her lifetime, there is some doubt about whether she should be regarded as a Queen of Scots; this could ultimately be a matter of interpretation. Most lists of the monarchs of Scotland do include her, but a few do not.
 Mary I (ruled 1542–1567) – she was executed in England in 1587

Kingdoms of England and Scotland / Kingdom of Great Britain 
 Mary II (reigned 1689–1694, jointly with her cousin and husband William III of Orange)
 Anne (reigned 1702–1714)

United Kingdom 
 Victoria (reigned 1837–1901) – the first monarch to hold the title of Empress of India.
 Elizabeth II (reigned 1952–2022) – longest-reigning British monarch, longest-reigning queen regnant and female head of state in world history.

Oceania

American Samoa 

 Tuimanufili, (ruled as 20th Tui Manu'a)
 Siliave, (ruled as 23rd Tui Manu'a)
 Seuea, (ruled as 27th Tui Manu'a)
 Matelita, (ruled 1891–1895, as 39th Tui Manu'a)

Australia 
 Victoria (ruled 1901)
 Elizabeth II (reigned 1952–2022)

French Polynesia

Bora Bora 
 Teriimaevarua II (ruled 1860–1873)
 Teriimaevarua III (ruled 1873–1895)

Huahine 

 Teha'apapa I (ruled 1760–1790)
 Teri'itaria II (ruled 1815–1852)
 Teha'apapa II (ruled 1868–1893)
 Teuhe (ruled 1888–1890) – she reigned under a rebellion government against her mother Queen Tehaapapa II
 Teha'apapa III (ruled 1893–1895)

Raiatea 
 Tehauroarii (ruled 1881–1884)
 Tuarii (ruled till 1897) – she reigned under a rebellion government against the French with the support of Teraupo'o after Tamatoa VI abdicated.

Rapa Iti 
 Daughter of Parima (ruled 1886–1887).

Rimatara 
 Tamaeva IV (ruled 1876–1892)
 Tamaeva V (ruled 1892–1901)

Tahiti 
 Purea (ruled 18th century), queen of the Teva clan on the southern part of the island before unification
 Pōmare IV (ruled 1827–1877)

Fiji 
 Elizabeth II  (reigned 1970–1987)

Hawaii 
 Ancient
 Kalanikauleleiaiwi, co-ruler of Hawaiʻi Island along with her brother Keaweʻīkekahialiʻiokamoku (ruled 1695–1725)
 Ululani, Chiefess of Hilo
 Kapau-a-Nuʻakea, 3rd Chiefess of Molokai
 Kamauliwahine, 4th Chiefess of Molokai
 Hualani, 5th Chiefess of Molokai
 Kanealai, Chiefess of Molokai
 Kūkaniloko, 11th Moʻi of Oʻahu
 Kalaimanuia, 12th Moʻi of Oʻahu (ruled 1600–1665)
 Kaikilani, 17th Moʻi of Hawaiʻi Island (ruled 1575–1605)
 Keakamahana, 19th Moʻi of Hawaiʻi Island (ruled 1635–1665)
 Keakealaniwahine, 20th Moʻi of Hawaiʻi Island (ruled 1665–1695)
 Kamakahelei, 22nd Moʻi of Kauaʻi (ruled 1770–1794)

 Kingdom
 Liliʻuokalani (ruled 1891–1893 and claimed status as queen until her death in 1917) – the only queen regnant of the Kingdom of Hawaii established by Kamehameha I

New Zealand 
 Elizabeth II (reigned 1952–2022)

Rarotonga 

 Makea Takau Ariki, Queen/Supreme High Chiefess of the Cook Islands (ruled 1871–1911) – was the last monarch and only queen regnant of the Kingdom of Rarotonga established in 1858, she ceased to be sovereign after 1888

Papua New Guinea 
 Elizabeth II (reigned 1975–2022)

Solomon Islands 
 Elizabeth II (reigned 1978–2022)

Tonga 
 Tupoumahe'ofo (ruled 1777–1781, as Tu'i Kanokupolu)
 Salote Tupou III (ruled 1918–1965)

Tuvalu 
 Elizabeth II (reigned 1978–2022)

Uvea (Wallis) 
 Toifale (ruled 1825)
 Falakika Seilala (ruled 1858–1869)
 Amelia Tokagahahau Aliki (ruled 1869–1895)
 Aloisia Brial (ruled 1953–1958)

Queens regent

Africa

Ashanti Empire 
 Yaa Asantewaa (c. 1840–1921) (regent), queen mother of Ejisu in the Ashanti Empire (1894–1902)

Axum Empire 
 Sofya (c. 330), queen mother of Ezana who ruled on his behalf during his infancy.

Comoros 
Mayotte
 Amina (queen regent) (1590–1596)
 Aisa (queen regent) (1700–1714)
 Monavo Fani (queen regent) (1714–1720)

Dahomey 
 Hangbe (regent) ruler of Dahomey 1716–1718 between the death of Akaba and the rule of Agaja

Egypt 
Ancient Egypt

 Neithhotep of the First Dynasty – likely ruled as regent on behalf of either Hor-Aha or Djer. Her exceptional status may point to her being a ruling Pharaoh in her own right, but this is disputed among Egyptologists.
 Merneith of the First Dynasty – was a consort and a regent of Ancient Egypt during the First Dynasty during the early part of the reign of her son Den. She may have been a ruler of Egypt in her own right (hence being included in the list of queens regnant as well). The possibility is based on several official records. Her rule occurred the 30th century B.C., for an undetermined period
 Nimaathap of the Second Dynasty – possibly ruled as regent on behalf of her son Djoser.
 Khentkawes I of the Fourth Dynasty – Khentkawes may have served as a regent for Thampthis (considered by some historians her son), or she may have ruled Egypt as Pharaoh.
 Khentkaus II of the Fifth Dynasty – While it is not confirmed that Khentkaus ruled as regent, several aspects of her tomb indicate she may have done so.
 Iput I of the Sixth Dynasty – possibly ruled as regent on behalf of her son Pepi I.
 Ankhesenpepi II of the Sixth Dynasty – ruled as regent on behalf of her son Pepi II.
 Ahhotep I of the Seventeenth Dynasty – ruled as regent on behalf of her son Ahmose I.
 Ahmose-Nefertari of the Eighteenth Dynasty – ruled as regent on behalf of her son Amenhotep I. Was later deified as a goddess in the centuries after her death.
 Hatshepsut of the Eighteenth Dynasty – was initially regent on behalf of her step-son Thutmose III, before becoming a reigning co-ruling Pharaoh in her own right.
 Mutemwiya of the Eighteenth Dynasty – ruled as regent on behalf of her son Amenhotep III.
 Twosret of the Nineteenth Dynasty – ruled as regent on behalf of her step-son Siptah and became ruling Pharaoh after his death.

Fatimid Caliphate
 Sitt al-Mulk – regent from 1021 to 1023 during the reign of her nephew Ali az-Zahir.
 Rasad – While never formally regent, she wielded a great deal of power during the reign of her son Al-Mustansir Billah and was the effective head of state from 1044 to 1062.

Ayyubid Sultanate
 Shajar al-Durr – de facto regent from November 1249 to February 1250.

Ethiopia 
 Romna Wark (mother of Eskender) 1478-?
 Eleni (regent) 1507–1516
 Mentewab (regent) 1723–1730
 Ga'ewa, regent of Mäzäga
 Genne Fa, regent of Kingdom of Gera

Kongo Kingdom 
 Isabel Maria da Gama (regent) 1962–1975

Mwali 
 Ravao (1840s) – regent during the early years of the reign of her daughter Djoumbé Fatima.

Sultanate of Tuggurt 
 Aisha (regent)

Batlokwa 
 Mmanthatisi (1813–1824) – regent on behalf of her son Sekonyela.

AmaMpondo 
 Lombekiso MaSobhuza Sigcau Dlamini of Qaukeni
 Bhongolwethu Fikilephi Ndamase of Nyandeni
 Nobandla Sigcau

Bapedi 
 Queen Manyako Thulare

Zulu 
 Mantfombi Dlamini Zulu

Swaziland /Eswatini 
 Labotsibeni Mdluli

Rharhabe 
 Noloyiso Sandile

America

Yaxchilan 
 Ik' Skull, also known as Lady Eveningstar (possibly ruled 742–752)

Asia

Abbasid Caliphate 
 Al-Khayzuran (regent) 775-789 – de facto regent during the reigns of her husband Al-Mahdi and her sons Al-Hadi and Harun al-Rashid
 Shaghab (regent) 908-932 – de facto regent during the reign of her son Al-Muqtadir

Bhopal State 
 Sikandar Begum (regent) 1844–1860 – regent on behalf of her daughter Shah Jahan Begum before becoming the Nawab of Bhopal from 1860 to 1868. She was succeeded by her daughter.

China 
Eastern Zhou
 Queen Dowager Xuan
 Zhao Weihou

Han Dynasty
 Empress Lü
 Wang Zhengjun
 Empress Dou (Zhang)
 Deng Sui
 Yan Ji
 Liang Na
 Dou Miao
 Empress He (Han dynasty)

Jin dynasty (266–420)
 Jia Nanfeng
 Yu Wenjun
 Chu Suanzi

Northern Wei
 Empress Dowager Feng
 Empress Dowager Hu (Northern Wei)

Tang dynasty
 Wu Zetian – she ruled first de facto co-ruler with her husband Emperor Gaozong until the end of his reign, and then as regent and thereafter as empress regnant in her own right
 Empress Wei (Tang dynasty)
 Princess Taiping 710-713

Liao dynasty
 Shulü Ping
 Xiao Yanyan
 Xiao Noujin

Northern Liao
 Xiao Puxiannü (:zh:蕭普賢女)

Qara Khitai
 Xiao Tabuyan
 Yelü Pusuwan

Western Xia
 Lady Mozang
 Empress Gongsu
 Empress Zhaojian

Northern Song (960–1127)
 Empress Liu (Zhenzong)
 Empress Cao (Song dynasty)
 Empress Gao (Song dynasty)
 Empress Xiang (1100)

Southern Song Dynasty
 Empress Meng
 Empress Wu (Song dynasty) (1162-1189)
 Empress Yang (Song dynasty) (1202-1233)
 Xie Daoqing

Yuan dynasty
 Töregene Khatun
 Oghul Qaimish
 Bulugan (1299-1307)
 Dagi Khatun (1307-1322)
 [[Empress Radnashiri] (1320-1323)
 Empress Budashiri (1332-1340)
 Empress Gi (1340-1368)

Ming dynasty
 Grand Empress Dowager Zhang (Hongxi) (1435-1442)
 Empress Dowager Sun (1435-1442)
 Empress Dowager Xiaoding (1572-1614)

Qing dynasty
 [[Empress Dowager Zhaosheng] (1643-1650, 1661-1667)
 Empress Dowager Ci'an (1861-1881)
 Empress Dowager Cixi (1861-1908)
 Empress Dowager Longyu (1908-1912)

Dongdan Kingdom
Empress Duanshun (:zh:端顺皇后)

Kara Del
 Nugandaširi (ruled 1460–1467) – In Kara Del of Xinjiang, there was no king for eight years and queen mother Nugandaširi ruled there alone.

Chagatai Khanate
 Orghana

India 

 Nayanika,regent for her minor son
prabhavatigupta,regent for her son divakarasena
 Lakshmibai, regent for her adopted son Damodar Rao
 Kittur Chennamma, regent for her adopted son Shivalingappa

Garhwal Kingdom 
 Rani Karnavati (regent)

Gond 
 Rani Durgavati (regent) ?–1564

Indo-Greek 
 Agathoclea

Maratha Empire 
 Tarabai (regent) 1700–1708

Madurai Nayak Kingdom  
  Mangammal

Iran 
 Atossa (regent) 522 BC-475 BC

Japan 
 Saionji Neishi, the only female Chitennokimi (:jp:治天の君)
 Ogiyaka, queen regent of Ryukyu Kingdom

Korea

Goguryeo 
 Queen Mother Buyeo, regent for King Taejo

Silla 
 Queen Jiso, regent for King Jinheung
 Queen Sinmok, regent for King Hyoso
 Queen Gyeongsu, regent for King Hyegong

Goryeo 
 Queen Cheonchu, regent for King Mokjong
 Queen Sasuk, regent for King Heonjong
 Princess Deoknyeong, regent for King Chungmok and King Chungjeong
 Queen Gongwon, regent for King U

Joseon 
 Queen Jeonghui, regent for King Yejong and King Seongjong
 Queen Insu regent for King Yejong and King Seongjong
 Queen Munjeong, regent for King Myeongjong
 Queen Insun, regent for King Seonjo
 Queen Jeongsun, regent for King Sunjo
 Queen Sunwon, regent for King Heonjong and King Cheoljong
 Queen Sinjeong, regent for King Gojong
 Queen Min regent for King Gojong

Mongolia 
 Töregene Khatun (regent) 1243–1246
 Oghul Qaimish (regent) 1248–1251
 Mandukhai Khatun (regent) 15th century

Chagatai Khanate 
 Orqina Khatun (regent) 1252–1260

Golden Horde 
 Tulun Beg Khanum (regent) 1370–1373

Kara-Khitan Khanate 
 Tabuyan (regent) 1144–1150
 Yelü Pusuwan (regent) 1164–1178

Kashmir 
 Didda (regent) 958-980 – she ruled first as a regent for her son and thereafter as sole ruler in her own right

Kazan Khanate 
 Söyembikä (regent) (1549–1551)

Neo-Assyrian Empire 
 Shammuramat (regent) 810-806 BC

Palmyrene Empire 
 Zenobia (regent) 267–271

Thailand 
 Sri Bajarindra (regent) 1862–1955
 Sirikit (regent) 1950–2016

Vietnam 
 Queen Cù thị (regent) 113–112 BC
 Empress Dương Vân Nga (regent) 979–981
 Empress Thượng Dương (regent) 1072–1073
 Lady Ỷ Lan (first regent 1069–1070) (second regent 1072–1085(6,?))
 Empress Linh Chiếu (regent) 1138–1158

Europe

Armenia 
 Zarmandukht (regent) 378–384

Croatia 
 Jelena Slavna (regent) 969-976

England 
 Ælfthryth (regent) 978-984
 Matilda of Flanders – ruled as regent during the absences of her husband, William the Conqueror.
 Eleanor of Aquitaine (regent) 1190–1191
 Eleanor of Provence (regent) 1253
 Isabella of France (regent) 1326–1330
 Philippa of Hainault (regent) 1346
 Joan of Navarre (regent) 1399–1403 and 1415
 Margaret of Anjou 1445-1461
 Catherine of Aragon (regent) six months in 1513
 Catherine Parr (regent) July–September 1544

France 
 Balthild (regent) 657-659
 Anne of Kiev (regent) 1060–1066
 Adela of Champagne (regent) 1190
 Blanche of Castile (regent) 1226–1235 and 1248–1252
 Isabeau of Bavaria (regent) 1393-1435
 Joan the Lame – ruled as regent while her husband, Philip VI of France, fought in the Hundred Years' War.
 Catherine de' Medici (regent) in 1552, 1560–1589
 Marie de' Medici (regent) 1610–1617
 Anne of Austria (regent) 1643–1651
 Maria Theresa of Spain (regent) 1667, 1672, 1678
 Marie Louise (regent) 1812 and 1814
 Eugénie de Montijo (regent) 1859, 1865 and 1870

Franks 
 Richilde of Provence (regent) 877
 Fredegund (regent) 584-597
 Ermentrude of Orleans 823-869

Hungary 
 Anastasia of Kiev regent for her minor aged son from 1063
 Helena of Serbia regent for her blind husband and later her minor aged son 1131-1146
 Eufrosina of Kiev regent for her son 1162-1172
 Margaret of France regent during husband reign 1186-1196
 Gertrude of Merania regent in 1213, but de facto co ruler 1205-1213
 Maria Lascarina de facto regent 1235-1270
 Elizabeth of Cumans regent during the minority of her son 1272-1277, but held de facto power 1270-1290
 Thomasina Morosini de facto regent 1293-1300
 Elizabeth of Poland de facto regent for sixty years, 1320-1380
 Elizabeth of Bosnia (regent) 1382–1387
 Barbara of Celje ruled as regent in the absence of her spouse between 1408-1435.
 Elizabeth of Luxembourg (regent) 1439-1442
 Elizabeth Szilágyi regent during absence of her son 1458
 Mary of Austria de facto regent 1521-1526

Illyrian Kingdom 
 Teuta (regent) 231–227 BC
 Etuta (regent) 169-168 BC
 Beroea (335 - 295 BC)
 Charel (regent) 522-533 BC

Khazar 
 Parsbit (regent) 730

Kievan Rus' 
 Olga (regent) 945-962

Netherlands 
 Emma (regent) 1890–1898

Lombards 
 Theodelinda (regent) 590-591

Ostrogoths 
 Amalasuntha (regent) 526-534
Poland

 Elizabeth (regent) 1370–1376

Portugal 

 Leonor Teles (regent) 1383–1384
 Eleanor of Aragon (regent) 1438–1439
 Eleanor of Viseu (regent) 1497–1499
 Catherine of Austria (regent) 1557–1562
 Luisa de Guzmán (regent) 1656–1662
 Catherine of Braganza (regent) 1701; 1704–1705
 Maria Anna of Austria (regent) 1742–1750
 Mariana Victoria of Spain (regent) 1776–1777

Russia 
 Sophia of Lithuania (regent) 1425–1432
 Elena Glinskaya (regent) 1533–1538
 Natalya Naryshkina (regent) 1682
 Sophia Alekseyevna (regent) 1682–1689
 Anna Leopoldovna (regent) 1740–1741

Sarmatians 
 Amage (ruled fl. 2nd-century)

Sweden 
 Ingeborg (de facto regent 1318–1319) (de jure regent 1319–1326)
 Hedwig Eleanor (regent) 1660–1672 & 1697

Roman Empire and immediate successors 
 Agrippina the Younger (regent) 49 – 56, as Augusta of the Roman Empire, ruled during the time of her husband and son.
 Julia Domna (regent) 197 – 217, as Augusta of the Roman Empire, ruled during the time of her husband and sons and she was the first woman in the Severan dynasty to rule.
 Julia Maesa (regent) 218 – 224, The Severan dynasty was dominated by powerful women, one of which was Maesa. Politically able and ruthless, she contended for political power after her sister's suicide and Afterwards she held power until she died in Rome.
 Julia Soaemias (regent) 218 – 222, After his son came to power, he came to power with his mother and She attended meetings of the senate, and even held a "Women's Senate" deciding on matters of fashion and protocol. She was honored with various titles, including 'Augusta, mater Augusti' (Augusta, mother of Augustus) and 'Mater castorum et senatus et totius domus divinae' (Mother of camp and the senate and the divine house).
 Julia Avita Mamaea (regent) 222 – 235, She was the mother of Roman Emperor Alexander Severus and served as regent of Rome during his minority, de facto during his reign. also Alexander confirmed his esteem for his mother and named her consors imperii (imperial consort).
 Ulpia Severina (regent) 275 – there is considerable numismatic evidence for Ulpia Severina ruling in her own right between the death of Aurelian and the election of Marcus Claudius Tacitus. Sources mention an interregnum between Aurelian and Tacitus, and some of Ulpia's coins appear to have been minted after Aurelian's death. As such she may have been the only woman to rule over the whole Roman Empire in her own power.

Bithynia 
 Etazeta (regent) 255–254 BC

Byzantine Empire 
 Pulcheria (regent) 414–453
 Irene of Athens (as regent, ruled 780–790 and 792–797) – she ruled first as regent for her son and thereafter as empress regnant in her own right
 Martina (empress) (regent) 613–641
 Theodora the Armenian (regent) – but some historians regard her as an empress regnant rather than just a regent
 Eudokia Makrembolitissa (regent) – but some historians regard her as an empress regnant rather than just a regent

Latin Empire 
 Yolanda of Flanders (regent) 1217–1219

Ottoman Empire 
 Mahpeyker Kösem Sultan (regent) 1623–1632 and 1648–1651
 Turhan Hatice Sultan (regent) 1651–1656
 Handan Sultan (regent) 1603-1605

Legendary and mythological queens

Chile 
 Vakai of Rapa Nui

China 
 Nüwa

Congo

Kuba Kingdom 
 Lobamba
 Go Kadi
 Gokare

Czech 
 Libuše of Bohemia

Ethiopia 

Claimed dates follow the Ethiopian calendar.
 Borsa (4321–4254 BC)
 Eylouka (3776–3731 BC)
 Nehasset Nais (2434–2404 BC)
 Kasiyope (1890–1871 BC) – Originated from Greek mythology
 Mumazes (1675–1671 BC)
 Aruas (1671 BC) – Daughter of Mumazes
 Helena (1358–1347 BC)
 Makeda (1013–982 BC) – The Biblical queen of Sheba in Ethiopian tradition
 Nicauta Kandake I (740–730 BC)
 Hadina (372–362 BC)
 Nikawla Kandake II (342–332 BC) – An alternate name for the Queen of Sheba
 Akawsis Kandake III (325–315 BC)
 Nikosis Kandake IV (242–232 BC)
 Awsena (99–88 BC)
 Nicotnis Kandake V (35–25 BC)
 Garsemot Kandake VI (40–50 AD) – Supposedly the Kandake from the Biblical story of the Ethiopian Eunuch
 Wakana (230 AD) – Reigned for 2 days
 Ahywa Sofya (299–332 AD) – Likely based on Sofya of Axum
 Adhana I (369–374 AD)
 Adhana II (412–418 AD)

Gideons Dynasty 
 Gudit, (ruled c. 960 – c. 1000)

Sidama people 
 Furra

Egypt 
 Nitocris of the Sixth Dynasty – Nitocris is mentioned within Herodotus' book Histories as being the last Pharaoh of the Sixth Dynasty of Egypt

Greece 
 Omphale of Lydia, wife of Heracles
 Gerana, queen of Pygmy

Amazons 
 Otrera, the daughter of Eurus (the east wind)
 Hippolyta, the Amazonian queen who possessed a magical girdle
 Penthesilea, the daughter of Ares and Otrera and the sister of Hippolyta, Antiope and Melanippe
 Antianara, the daughter of Ares and Otrera and the sister of Hippolyta, Antiope and Melanippe
 Eurypyle
 Lampedo
 Marpesia

India 
 Goddess Sita of Ayodhya
 Draupadi of Hastinapura and Indraprastha

Iran 
 Humay Chehrzad

Iraq 
 Semiramis, the legendary queen of king Ninus, succeeding him to the throne of Assyria
 Nitocris of Babylon, the ruling queen of Babylon described by Herodotus in his Histories

Ireland 
 Macha, (ruled 661–654 BC)
 Medb, Queen of Connacht

Italy 
 Lavinia

Japan 
 Empress Jingū (ruled 201–269)
 Iitoyo

Korea 
 Lady Saso, honorary queen regnant of Silla

Libya 
 Cyrene, queen of the city Cyrene
 Lamia, queen of Libya

Malaysia 
 Che Siti Wan Kembang of Kelantan

Mexico

Aztec Empire 
 Atotoztli II (possibly ruled 1466–1472, disputed)

Mongolia 
 Alan Gua, a mythical figure from the Secret History of the Mongols

Myanmar 
 Panhtwar

Norway 
 Lagertha

Pakistan 
 Nur Bakht Khatun of Trakhan Dynasty
 the Dareli queen of Trakhan Dynasty

Poland 
 Wanda

Somalia 
 Amel Ali of Somali mythology
 Arawelo of Proto-Somali

Sudan 
 Karimala of Nubia (depicted in Semna)
 Pelekh Candace of Meroë (c. 345–332 BCE)

Tunisia 
 Dido (ruled 814 – c. 760 BC) – also known as Alyssa. Founder of Carthage, according to tradition

Turkey 
 Zugalum of Harran (ruled 2400 BC)

Turkmenistan 
 Zarinaea, legendary Sacae woman ruler, the sister of Cyraedus, and the wife of Marmares, ruler of the Parthians

United Kingdom 
 Queen Gwendolen (ruled 11th century BCE)
 Queen Cordelia (ruled 8th century BCE)
 Queen Marcia (ruled 4th century BCE)

Vietnam 
 Lady Po Nagar of Champa, According to Cham legend, was the founder of the Cham nation
 Âu Cơ

Yemen 
 Bilkis in Yemen, claimed to be Queen of Sheba

Titular and current constituent queens

Botswana 
 Mosadi Seboko (ruled 2002–present), the kgosikgolo of the Balete people

Brazil 
 Isabel, titular empress regnant of Brazil

Chile 
 Laure-Therese Cros, pretender to throne of Kingdom of Araucanía and Patagonia (ruled 1903–1916)

China 
 Chen Shuozhen (ruled 653) – She led a peasant uprising in 653. During the rebellion, she declared herself huangdi. Jian Bozan recognized her as a female huangdi.

Haiti 
 Ti Memenne of La Gonâve (ruled c. 1920s) – she was the tribal ruler of La Gonâve

Hungary 
 Elizabeth (ruled 1437-1442) - claimant queen regnant of Hungary

Italy 
 Isabella of Majorca, titular queen regnant of Majorca

Jamaica 
 Queen Nanny, leader of the Jamaican Maroons

Korea 
 Yi Hae-won, titular empress regnant of Korean Empire (ruled 2006–2020)

Mexico 

 María Josepha, titular empress regnant of Mexico
 María Ana, titular empress regnant of Mexico
 María Gisela, titular empress regnant of Mexico

New Zealand 
 Te Atairangikaahu, queen of Māori (ruled 1966–2006)

Nigeria 
 Ahebi Ugbabe

Panama 
 Rufina Santana, queen of Naso people (ruled 1982–1988)

Romania 
 Margareta of Romania, pretender to throne of Kingdom of Romania

Spain 
 Constance, claimant queen regnant of Castile
 Joanna la Beltraneja, claimant queen regnant of Castile

United States Virgin Islands 
 Mary Thomas, also known as Queen Mary, the leader of the 1878 St. Croix labor riot

Chieftainess

Burundi 
 Nandabunga

Cameroon 
 Marie-Thérèse Assiga Ahanda

Dominican Republic 
 Iguanamá (or Higuanamá), Cacica of Higüey, one of the Chiefdoms of Hispaniola (ruled c. 1514)

Fiji 
 Lala Mara, the Roko Tui Dreketi of Rewa (ruled 1957–2004)
 Teimumu Kepa, the Roko Tui Dreketi of Rewa (ruled 2004–present)

Haiti 
 Anacaona, Cacica of Jaragua, one of the Chiefdoms of Hispaniola

Ireland 
 Grace O'Malley, also known as "The Pirate Queen", chieftainess of the Ó Máille clan in Umaill

Israel 
 Deborah, the only female judge of Israelite tribes in Biblical judges

Kyrgyzstan 
 Kurmanjan Datka, also known as "The Tsaritsa of Alai", tribal leader of Alay (ruled 1862–1876)

Malawi 
 Theresa Kachindamoto

New Zealand

Rarotonga 
 Makea Te Vaerua Ariki, High Chiefess of Te Au O Tonga (ruled 1845–1857)
 Pa Upoko Takau Ariki, High Chiefess of Takitumu (ruled 1855–1890)
 Tinomana Mereana Ariki, High Chiefess of Puaikura (ruled 1881–1908)

Nigeria 
 Sarraounia

South Africa

Xhosa 
 Nosizwe Tyali, Chief of Imingcangathelo
 Nosiseko Gaika, Chief of Amambombo (Ngqika)
 Nomasilakhe Komani, Chief of Imingqalasi

United States and Canada

Crow tribe 
 Pine Leaf (ruled 1830s)

Giluts'aaw 
 Victoria Young

Pamunkey 
 Cockacoeske (ruled 1656–1686)
 Queen Betty (ruled 1686–1708)
 Queen Ann (ruled 1708–1723)

Sakonnet 
 Awashonks

Seneca tribe 
 Queen Alliquippa (ruled 1754)

Wampanoag 
 Weetamoo

Yemen 
 Sharifa Fatima

Female rulers of feudal states and substates

Europe

Albania

Duchy of Durazzo 
 Joanna (ruled 1348–1368)

Principality of Albania 
 Helena Thopia (ruled 1402–1403)

Principality of Valona 
 Komnina Balšić (ruled 1385–1396)
 Ruđina Balšić (ruled 1414–1417)

Belgium

Duchy of Brabant 
 Joanna (ruled 1355–1406)
 Mary (ruled 1477–1482)
 Isabella Clara Eugenia (ruled 1598–1621), with Albert
 Maria Theresa (ruled 1740–1780)

France

Duchy of Aquitaine 
 Eleanor of Aquitaine (ruled 1137–1204)

Counts and Dukes of Angoulême 
 Isabella of Angoulême (ruled 1202–1246)

Germany

County of Veldenz 
 Agnes, Countess of Veldenz, ruled 1260–1277

Duchy of Bar 
 Sophie, Countess of Bar ruled 1033–1093

Romania

Principality of Transylvania 
 Catherine of Brandenburg (ruled 1629–1630)
 Maria Theresa (ruled 1740–1780)

Female Rulers of crown land and personal union

Estonia 
Part of the Kingdom of Denmark
 Margaret Sambiria (ruled 1266–1282)
 Christina (ruled 6 November 1632 – 6 June 1654)

Part of the Swedish Empire
 Ulrika Eleonora (ruled 5 December 1718 – 29 February 1720)

Part of the Russian Empire
 Catherine I (ruled 8 February 1725 – 17 May 1727)
 Anna (ruled 13 February 1730 – 28 October 1740)
 Elizabeth (ruled 6 December 1741 – 5 January 1762)
 Catherine II (ruled 9 July 1762 – 6 November 1796)

Finland 
Part of the Kingdom of Sweden
 Margaret I of Denmark (ruled 1389–1412)
 Christina (ruled 1632–1654)
 Ulrika Eleonora (ruled 1719–1720)

Iceland 
Possession of Norway
 Margaret I (ruled 1388 – 28 October 1412)

Latvia

Swedish Livonia 
 Ulrika Eleonora (ruled 1719–1720)

Slovakia 
Part of the Kingdom of Hungary
 Mary (ruled 1382–1385 and 1386–1395)
 Maria Theresa (Queen, "King") (ruled 1740–1780)

Slovenia

Duchy of Carniola 
 Maria Theresa (ruled c. 1740–1780)

Ukraine

Kingdom of Galicia and Lodomeria 
 Maria Theresa (ruled c. 1772–1780)

Notes

Bibliography 
 L. Pierotti Cei, Madonna Costanza, Regina di Sicilia e d'Aragona, Mondadori, Milan 1995.
 S. Runciman, I Vespri siciliani, Rizzoli, Milan 1975.

External links 
 Contemporary reigning queens (Zárate's Political Collections)

Queens regnant
Lists of women by occupation

Empresses regnant
Women monarchs